Wrangler is an American manufacturer of jeans and other clothing items, particularly workwear. The brand is owned by Kontoor Brands Inc., which also owns Lee. Its headquarters is in downtown Greensboro, North Carolina, in the United States, with production plants located throughout the world.

History

Wrangler Jeans were first made by the Blue Bell Overall Company, which had acquired the brand when it took over Casey Jones in the mid-1940s. Blue Bell employed Bernard Lichtenstein ("Rodeo Ben"), a Polish tailor from Łódź who worked closely with cowboys, to help design jeans suitable for rodeo use. He convinced several well-known rodeo riders of the time to endorse the new design.

The 13MWZ style, short for the thirteenth version of men's western jeans with zipper, was introduced in 1947. This model is still available and the company has since introduced several other lines that are more designated towards a specific group or demographic. Examples include 20X, Riggs, and Aura. Wrangler also exports its goods to many countries, with Europe and Australia being some of its main export markets.

Timeline

1897: Twenty-year-old C.C. Hudson leaves Spring Hill Farm in Williamson County, Tennessee, and makes his way to Greensboro, North Carolina, seeking his fortune in the emerging textile industry. He finds work in a factory making overalls, where he earns 25 cents a day sewing on buttons.

1904; Hudson's workplace closes. He and a few others buy several of the sewing machines, lease space above a downtown grocery store and incorporate as the Hudson Overall Company.

1919: The business builds its first factory on South Elm Street in Greensboro and changes its name to Blue Bell Overall Company.

1936: Blue Bell launches Super Big Ben Overalls made out of 100% Sanforized Fabric that reduces shrinkage after washing to less than 1%. This sets a new standard for the industry.

1943: Blue Bell acquires the Casey Jones Work-Clothes Company and the rights to a rarely used Casey Jones brand name: Wrangler.

1946: Blue Bell starts to develop a jeans line for cowboys, hiring famous tailor "Rodeo Ben". Blue Bell workers take part in a contest to give the jeans a brand name. The winning name is Wrangler, synonymous with the name for a working cowboy.

1947: After designing and testing 13 pairs of prototype jeans, Blue Bell introduces the Wrangler 11MWZ to American consumers. The Wrangler Jeans featured several innovations aimed particularly at cowboys:  Felled outseams and inseams, rear pockets positioned for comfort in the saddle, 'no scratch' rivet pocket reinforcement, a zipper fly, and the use of a strong tack in the crotch instead of a metal rivet. A promotional campaign is launched featuring 11MWZ test riders and rodeo legends Freckles Brown, Bill Linderman, and Jim Shoulders.

1952: Lot number 11MWZ is renamed 13MWZ to conform to the  denim weight being used to manufacture the style.

1962: Blue Bell opens a factory in Belgium and the Wrangler brand name enjoys a successful launch in Europe.

1974: The Professional Rodeo Cowboys Association (PRCA) officially endorses Wrangler Jeans.
 
1983: Wrangler sponsor European Football champions Nottingham Forest F.C.

1986: Blue Bell merges with the VF Corporation of Pennsylvania.

1996: One of every five pairs of jeans sold in America is a Wrangler. 

1997: The 50th anniversary of the 13MWZ. A Special Collectors Edition of the 13MWZ is created to celebrate this event.

2000: "Whatever You Ride" television ad campaign is launched, focusing on core brand values.

2001: Wrangler commences making its jeans in Mexico.

2002: "There's a bit of the West in all of us" TV and print ad campaign is launched.

2004: A new Wrangler European print campaign is launched, "Wanted," representing a modern expression of Wrangler's roots. Wrangler also celebrates 100 years of manufacturing quality denim by producing Blue Bell by Wrangler, a limited edition collection that reproduces the first Wrangler jeans right down to the last detail. Wrangler also reworks the mainstream collection, producing new fits using icons inspired by the very first jeans designed by Rodeo Ben. The Wrangler brand is now recognized in 22 European countries.

2005: Wrangler's last U.S. sewing plant is closed.

2011: Wrangler conducts consumer design competition to find the next thing in jeans. The winner, Song Anh Nguyen of Greensboro, had her design produced by Wrangler and made available for sale.

2018: Wrangler parent company VF Corporation announces plans to spin off its jeans operations including Wrangler into a separate public company.

2019: Wrangler, together with Lee and Rock & Republic, becomes part of Kontoor Brands, an independent publicly traded spin-off from VF Corporation.

2022: Wrangler Apparel Corp. files a U.S. trademark application for the name WRANGLERVERSE for, among other services, hosting live and virtual performances, concerts, and social entertainment events and providing virtual environments in which users can interact for recreational, leisure, or entertainment purposes.  The application signals an intent to expand the WRANGLER brand into the Metaverse.

Media advertising

One Tough Customer
Wrangler rose to prominence to many eyes in the early 1980s with their One Tough Customer campaign in which they sponsored most prominently NASCAR Winston Cup Series driver Dale Earnhardt to became an iconic car and driver in the history of the sport. The company also sponsored other drivers such as Ricky Rudd, Jody Ridley, Bobby Hillin Jr., Steve Park, Martin Truex Jr., Ty Dillon, Ryan Blaney, and Matt DiBenedetto between 1984 and 2020.

See also
Wrangler, for non-trademark meanings of the word
Lee (jeans)
VF Corporation
Rock and Republic

References

External links

Clothing brands of the United States
Companies based in Greensboro, North Carolina
1970s fashion
1980s fashion
1990s fashion
2000s fashion
2010s fashion
Jeans by brand
Clothing companies established in 1904